Following is a list of all Article III United States federal judges appointed by President Franklin D. Roosevelt during his presidency. In total Roosevelt appointed 194 Article III federal judges, more than twice as many as the previous record of 82 appointed by Calvin Coolidge. Among them were: nine justices to the Supreme Court of the United States, including the appointment of a sitting associate justice as chief justice, 51 judges to the United States Courts of Appeals, and 134 judges to the United States district courts.

Additionally, 13 Article I federal judge appointments are listed, including 3 judges to the United States Court of Customs and Patent Appeals, 4 judges to the United States Court of Claims and 6 judges to the United States Customs Court.

United States Supreme Court justices

Courts of appeals

District courts

Specialty courts (Article I)

United States Court of Customs and Patent Appeals

United States Court of Claims

United States Customs Court

Notes

Renominations

References
General

 

Specific

Sources
 Federal Judicial Center

Judicial appointments
Roosevelt, Franklin D.

Franklin D. Roosevelt-related lists